Williams Mix (1951–1953) is a 4'15" musique concrete composition by John Cage for eight simultaneously played independent quarter-inch magnetic tapes. The first octophonic music, the piece was created by Cage with the assistance of Earle Brown, Morton Feldman, and David Tudor, using many tape sound sources and a paper score he created for the construction. "Presignifying the development of algorithmic composition, granular synthesis and sound diffusion," it was the third of five pieces completed in the Project for Music for Magnetic Tape (1951–1954), funded by dedicatee architect Paul F Williams Jr.

The material, recorded by Louis and Bebe Barron, was organized in six categories: city, country, electronic, manually produced, wind, and "small" sounds; "subjected...to I Ching manipulations, producing constant jumps from one sound to another or buzzing, scrambled textures of up to sixteen simultaneous layers." The 193-page score, "a full-size drawing of the tape fragments, which served as a 'score' for the splicing," is described by Cage as similar to "a dressmaker's pattern – it literally shows where the tape shall be cut, and you lay the tape on the score itself." Thus, like a recipe, the piece may be recreated using different tapes and the score.

The work was premiered at the 25th Year Retrospective Concert Of The Music Of John Cage on May 15, 1958, and was recorded by Columbia Records producer George Avakian and issued by him on a three-LP set with a booklet including extensive notes and illustrations of scores.

Larry Austin later created a computer program, the "Williams (re)Mix(er)", based on an analysis of ""Williams Mix"", which could "yield ever-new Williams Mix scores." With this software, Austin created  Williams (re)Mix[ed] (1997–2000), an octophonic variation of Williams Mix using different sound sources.

In 2012, Tom Erbe became the first person to recreate "Williams Mix" from the original score, entering each tape edit from the 193 page score into the computer, and creating performance software carefully following Cage's notes. Erbe's debut performance of "Williams Mix" was on Cage's 100th birthday, September 5, 2012, at Fresh Sound in San Diego. Erbe also created a version of "Williams Mix" for clipping.'s 2014 album CLPPNG, using clipping. samples to re-record the work according to the original instructions.

Discography
 John Cage (1994). The 25 Year Retrospective Concert of the Music of John Cage. Wergo [6247].
 (2000/2005). OHM: The Early Gurus of Electronic Music. Ellipsis Arts [3690].
 Larry Austin (2001). Octo-Mixes, Larry Austin, Octophonic Computer Music, 1996–2001. EMF CD 039.
 John Cage (2010). Fontana Mix. Él.
 Clipping. (2014). Last track on CLPPNG. Subpop SP1071.

References

Further reading
 Schrader, Barry (1982). "Composing with Cutting and Splicing Techniques: Williams Mix by John Cage", Introduction to Electro-Acoustic Music. .

Electronic compositions
Compositions by John Cage
1953 compositions
Spatial music